The Benutan Dam, also spelled Binutan, is an embankment dam on the Benutan River in Tutong District, Brunei. The dam was completed in 1988 with the primary purpose of increasing water supply to the capital of Brunei, Bandar Seri Begawan.

See also
Ulu Tutong Dam

References

Dams in Brunei
Dams completed in 1998
Tutong District